Anniken Mork (born 16 January 1991) is a Norwegian ski jumper, who represents the club Ready. 

She competed at the FIS Nordic World Ski Championships 2017 in Lahti, Finland.

References

External links 

1991 births
Living people
Skiers from Oslo
Norwegian female ski jumpers